Al-Zaura (also spelt as Al-Zawra) was a newspaper published in Baghdad by the then Ottoman Governor of Iraq Midhat Pasha in 1869. It was the official newspaper of the then Ottoman Province of Baghdad and the first newspaper to be published in Iraq. It was published in Arabic and Turkish languages. It was a biweekly newspaper published every Tuesday and Saturday. It was started after a personal effort by Midhat Pasha who brought a printing press from Paris. It was shut down in 1917 after Ottoman Rule came to an end in Iraq and the British gained control of Iraq over 2607 issues had been published.

References

Publications established in 1869
Publications disestablished in 1917
Defunct newspapers published in Iraq
Arabic-language newspapers
Turkish-language newspapers
1869 establishments in the Ottoman Empire
Mass media in Baghdad